Abderrahmane Benkhalfa (July 2, 1949 – April 23, 2021) was an Algerian financial expert. He was general delegate for the Algerian Association of Banks and Financial Institutions, and director of the Bank of Algeria. He was Algerian Minister of Finance. He was also a member of the Finance and Credit Council at the Bank of Algeria. He was described as being pro-private-sector.

Education
He obtained a Bachelor's in Commercial and Financial Sciences from the Superior College of Business at the University of Algiers, and went on to obtain a Doctorate in Management Sciences from the French University of Grenoble in 1977. He also attended a specialization course at the University of Warsaw in Poland.

Death
On 23 April 2021, Benkhalfa died at Aïn Naadja Military Hospital, Algiers, from complications related to COVID-19.

References

1949 births
2021 deaths
Finance ministers of Algeria
University of Algiers alumni
Grenoble Alpes University alumni
National Liberation Front (Algeria) politicians
People from Tiaret
Deaths from the COVID-19 pandemic in Algeria
21st-century Algerian people